The Kentucky Humanities Council, Inc. is an independent, nonprofit affiliate of the National Endowment for the Humanities in Washington, D.C. The Council is supported by the National Endowment and by private contributions. It is not a state agency, and receives no state funds. The group performs living history dramas and publishes Kentucky Humanities magazine.

See also
List of state humanities councils

External links
Home page

National Endowment for the Humanities
Non-profit organizations based in Kentucky
Arts organizations based in Kentucky